An incomplete list of the tallest structures in Turkey. The list contains all types of structures taller than 150 metres in Turkey. Please correct where necessary and expand.

External links 
 http://www.ead.eurocontrol.int/eadbasic/pamslight/LKBVVV5JVZLQA/EN/AIP/ENR/LT_ENR_5_4_en_2010-09-23.pdf

Towers in Turkey
Tallest, structures
Turkey